Fluoromethylidyne is not a stable chemical species but a metastable radical containing one highly reactive carbon atom bound to one fluorine atom with the formula CF. The carbon atom has a lone-pair and a single unpaired (radical) electron in the ground state.

Ground-state fluoromethylidyne radicals can be produced by the ultraviolet photodissociation of dibromodifluoromethane at 248 nanometer wavelength.

It readily and irreversibly dimerises to difluoroacetylene, also known as difluoroethyne, perfluoroacetylene, or di- or perfluoroethylyne. Under certain conditions it can hexamerise to hexafluorobenzene.

See also
 Carbyne

References

Free radicals
Reactive intermediates